Skien Fritidspark is a multi-purpose stadium located in Skien, Norway. It was completed in 2008, and is built around Skienshallen from 1968. The arena comprises two indoor sportshalls, an ice hockey venue, a large water park and several outdoor sports facilities.

In 1975 Skienshallen hosted the European Gymnastics Championships, where Nadia Comăneci had her international breakthrough.

References

External links

Handball venues in Norway
Indoor arenas in Norway
Indoor ice hockey venues in Norway
Sports venues in Skien
Multi-purpose stadiums in Norway
1968 establishments in Norway
Sports venues completed in 1968